The Damar flycatcher (Ficedula henrici) is a species of bird in the family Muscicapidae. It is endemic to Indonesia.

Its natural habitat is subtropical or tropical moist lowland forests.  It is affected by habitat loss. Having turned out to be more common than previously believed, it is downlisted from Vulnerable to Near Threatened in the 2007 IUCN Red List.

References
 BirdLife International (2007a): [ 2006-2007 Red List status changes ]. Retrieved 2007-AUG-26.
 BirdLife International (2007b): Damar Flycatcher - BirdLife Species Factsheet. Retrieved 2007-AUG-28.

Damar flycatcher
Birds of the Maluku Islands
Damar flycatcher
Taxonomy articles created by Polbot